Bareilly  division is an administrative geographical unit of Uttar Pradesh state of India. Bareilly is the administrative headquarters of the division. Part of the Rohilkhand region, Bareilly division has four major cities in west Uttar Pradesh - Bareilly, Badaun, Pilibhit and Shahjahanpur.

Bareilly is the medical hub of Uttar Pradesh, one of the biggest industrial areas and the third fastest developing city of Uttar Pradesh.

Budaun is a politically sensational and historical city and has many historical sites, one of the oldest existing city of India, and was the capital of India during Iltutmish's rule. It is also the sixth fastest developing city in Uttar Pradesh.

Shahjahanpur is also one of the main cities of west Uttar Pradesh.

Currently (2005), the division consists of the districts of

 Bareilly District
 Badaun District
 Pilibhit District
 Shahjahanpur District

Major cities
 Bareilly
 Budaun
 Shahjahanpur
 Ujhani
 Pilibhit
 Puranpur
 Faridpur
 Sahaswan
 Nawabganj
 Bisalpur, Pilibhit

References

 
Divisions of Uttar Pradesh